James Vincent Casey (September 22, 1914 – March 14, 1986) was an American prelate of the Roman Catholic Church. He served as Bishop of Lincoln, Nebraska (1957–1967) and Archbishop of Denver, Colorado (1967–1986).

Biography

Early life and education
The youngest of two children, James Casey was born in Osage, Iowa, to James Gordon Casey and Nina (née Nims) Casey. His father was a Democratic member of the Iowa House of Representatives from 1933 to 1935. 

James Casey the younger attended Osage High School, where he was class president and captain of the football team. He attended Loras College in Dubuque, obtaining a Bachelor of Arts degree in 1936. He then studied at the Pontifical North American College and the Pontifical Gregorian University in Rome.

Priesthood
Casey was ordained to the priesthood on December 8, 1939. Upon returning to Iowa in 1940, he served as a curate at St. John Church in Independence, Iowa, until 1944. During this period he also taught at the high school and coached boys' and girls' basketball.

During World War II, Casey served as a chaplain in the United States Navy (1944–1946), working with troops in the South Pacific and reaching the rank of lieutenant. He returned from service in 1946, and then furthered his studies at the Catholic University of America in Washington, D.C. He earned a doctorate in canon law in 1949 with a thesis entitled: "A Study of Canon 2222, Paragraph One". That same year he became private secretary to Archbishop Henry Rohlman. 

Casey was raised to the rank of papal chamberlain in 1952 and to a domestic prelate in 1954. He also served as moderator of the Catholic Lawyers Guild (1954–1957), director of the archdiocesan Family Life Bureau (1955–1957), and president of the Canon Law Society of America (1956–1957).

Auxiliary Bishop and Bishop of Lincoln
On April 5, 1957, Casey was appointed as an auxiliary bishop of the Diocese of Lincoln and Titular Bishop of Citium by Pope Pius XII. He receives his episcopal consecration on April 24, 1957, from Archbishop Amleto Cicognani, with Archbishop Leo Binz and Bishop Loras Lane serving as co-consecrators. 

Following the death of Bishop Louis Kucera in May 1957, Casey was named the sixth bishop of Lincoln on June 14, 1957. During his nine-year-long tenure, he established a chancery building, a school for special needs children, a retreat house, several high schools and grade schools, and a Newman Center. His most prominent accomplishment was the erection of the Cathedral of the Risen Christ in Lincoln; he broke ground for the new cathedral in June 1963 and later dedicated it in August 1965. The Southern Nebraska Register declared that Casey "accomplished more for the Diocese of Lincoln in 10 years than any other comparable period in our history." Between 1962 and 1965, he attended all four sessions of the Second Vatican Council in Rome, which he described as "a revolution."

Archbishop of Denver
On February 18, 1967, Casey was appointed the second archbishop of the Archdiocese of Denver by Pope Paul VI. Soon after arriving in Denver, he earmarked $1 million in archdiocesan funds on efforts to help the poor. Among these efforts was the Samaritan House Homeless Shelter. He created the archdiocesan Office of Hispanic Concerns in 1968, later raising it to the vicariate level in 1981. 

An opponent of American participation in the Vietnam War, Casey encouraged President Richard Nixon to "set a definite date for the withdrawal of our American military personnel from Vietnam at the earliest possible moment." In 1972 ,he moved out of the episcopal mansion in Cheesman Park and into a penthouse at the Park Lane Apartments in Washington Park. He gave greater power to laity and nuns, and was forced to close or consolidate several Catholic schools. He joined the Colorado Council of Churches, and allowed Catholics to participate in the crusades of the evangelist Billy Graham. During his 19-year-long tenure, Casey dedicated a total of twenty-four parishes. He also increased the number of priests from 327 to 356, and the number of Catholics from 261,844 to 330,270.

Death and legacy
While playing golf in October 1984, Casey collapsed from a ruptured artery in his abdomen. He suffered several setbacks during a long recovery, and delegated the administration of the archdiocese to his vicar general. On March 1, 1986, he was stricken with a cerebral aneurysm at his residence and then taken unconscious to St. Joseph Hospital in Denver. He underwent surgery the next day to remove a blood clot from his brain. Never regaining consciousness, James Casey died on March 14, 1986, at age 71.

Following his death, Colorado Governor Richard Lamm declared, "[Casey] didn't just talk about the relevance of religious belief, he lived it."

References

1914 births
1986 deaths
People from Osage, Iowa
Roman Catholic Archdiocese of Dubuque
Roman Catholic bishops of Lincoln
Roman Catholic archbishops of Denver
Participants in the Second Vatican Council
Catholic University of America alumni
World War II chaplains
United States Navy chaplains
United States Navy officers
20th-century Roman Catholic archbishops in the United States
Religious leaders from Iowa
Catholics from Iowa
Military personnel from Iowa